Snehasagaram is a 1992 Indian Malayalam film, directed by Sathyan Anthikad, starring Murali, Urvashi, Manoj K. Jayan and Sunitha in the lead roles.

Plot
Josekutty and Treesa, a happily married couple, move to a town in Tamil Nadu. However, Treesa begins suspecting Josekutty of getting attracted to Kaveri, a playful young woman.

Cast
Murali as Josekutty
Sunitha as Kaveri
Urvasi as Teresa Josekutty
Manoj K. Jayan as Muthu
Innocent as Ramayyan
Oduvil Unnikrishnan as Vishnunarayan Nambuthiri	
Nedumudi Venu as Thankachan
Jalaja as Marykunju
Meena Ganesh as Kunjammuma
Bobby Kottarakkara as Chellappan
Janagaraj as Pazhaniyappa Gounder
Ragini as Padmini
KPAC Lalitha
Philomina
Sankaradi

Soundtrack

References

External links

1992 films
1990s Malayalam-language films
Films scored by Johnson